Palfuria gladiator is a spider species of the family Zodariidae.

Etymology
The epithet refers to the shape of the male carapace and the big tarsal claw on the male palp.

Distribution
P. gladiator is only known from Namibia.

References

 Szüts, T. & Jocqué, R. (2001). A revision of the Afrotropical spider genus Palfuria (Araneae, Zodariidae). Journal of Arachnology 29(2):205–219. PDF

Endemic fauna of Namibia
Zodariidae
Spiders of Africa
Spiders described in 2001